The Rajbanshi, also Rajbongshi and Koch-Rajbongshi,  are peoples from Lower Assam, North Bengal, eastern Bihar, Terai region of eastern Nepal, Rangpur division of North Bangladesh and Bhutan who have in the past sought an association with the Koch dynasty.  Today, they speak various Indo-Aryan languages, though in the past they might have spoken Tibeto-Burman languages.

In 2020, Kamatapur Autonomous Council has been created for socio-economic development and political rights of Koch-Rajbongshi community.

They are related to the ethnic Koch people found in Meghalaya but are distinguished from them as well as from the Hindu caste called Koch in Upper Assam that receives converts from different tribes. Rajbanshi (of royal lineage) alludes to the community's claimed connection with the Koch dynasty.

Etymology 
The Rajbanshi (literal meaning: of the royal lineage) community gave itself this name after 1891 following a movement to distance itself from an ethnic identity and acquire the higher social status of Kshatriya Hindu varna instead. The kshatriya identity was established by linking the community to the Koch dynasty.  The Rajbanshis were officially recorded as Koch till the 1901 census.  The name Rajbanshi is a 19th century neologism.

Demography 

Worldwide, there are an estimated 11-12 million Rajbanshi people. According to 1971 Census figures, 80% of the North Bengal population was once of the Rajbanshi tribe. As per as last late 2011 census, It has been estimated that it have came down to just mere 30%. The un-checked infiltration along the Indo-Bangladesh border and intrusion of Biharis caused a lot of demographic change over time. Population of Bengali-speaking Muslims, Bihari Muslims and Bangladeshi low-caste Namasudras have increased rapidly in areas like: Jalpaiguri, Koch Bihar, Alipurduar etc. over the last 50 years, hence causing demographic changes over time.

History
In ancient times, the land which the Rajbanshi inhabit, called Kamarupa, was considered an 'unclean' frontier zone, where people of varying ethnic backgrounds mixed on the edge of Aryavarta. Its inhabitants spoke Tibeto-Burman languages. There is no mention of 'Rajbanshi' in Persian records, the Ahom Buranjis or the 18th-century Darrang Raja Vamsavali: the genealogical records of the Koch Bihar royal family, although there is mention of the Koch as a distinct social group.

Late 19th century and early 20th century
Starting from 1872 to 1891, in a series of social movements, a section of Koch who were at tribal or semi-tribal form in present North Bengal and Western Assam in an effort to promote themselves up the caste hierarchy tried to dissociate themselves from their ethnic identity by describing themselves as Rajbanshi (of the royal lineage). This attempt of social upliftment was a reaction against the ill treatment and humiliation faced by the community from the caste Hindus who referred to the Koch as mleccha or barbarians. The term Rajbanshi was used to connect the group with Koch royalty who called themselves Shiva-banshi or Rajbanshi under Biswa Singha, the founder of the Koch dynasty and a tribal who was Hinduised and promoted to Kshatriya varna in the early 1500s.

By 1891, the Koch who came to be known as Rajbanshi claimed a new status of Bhanga Kshatriya to proof themselves to be a provincial variety of the Kshatriyas, the movement of Bhanga Kshatriya was undertaken by  Harimohan Ray Khajanchi who established the "Rangpur Bratya Kshatriya Jatir Unnati Bidhayani Sabha" for the upward mobility of the community in the Hindu society.

To justify this, the group collected reference from Hindu religious text such as the Kalika Purana, Yogini Tantra etc and created legends that they originally belonged to the kshatriya varna but left their homeland in the fear of annihilation by the brahmin sage Parashurama and took refuge in Paundradesh (currently in Northern bengal and Rangpur division of Bangladesh) and later came to be known as Bhanga Kshatriyas. The story so created was to provide a convincing myth to assert their Kshatriya origin  and perform as an ideological base for the movement but this failed to make any wider effect on the community and were denied the Kshatriya status.

In 1910, the Rajbanshi who were classified as the member of the same caste as the Koches claimed a new identity of Rajbanshi Kshatriya, this time under the leadership of Panchanan Barma who established the Kshatriya Samiti in Rangpur, it separated the Rajbanshis from their Koch identity and was also successful in getting the Kshatriya status after getting recognition from different Brahmin pandits of Mithila, Rangpur, Kamrup and Koch Bihar. Following this, the district magistrate gave permission to use surnames like Roy, Ray, Barman, Sinha, Adhikary etc. to replace the older traditional surnames like Sarkar, Ghosh, Das or Mandal and the Kshatriya status was granted in the final report of 1911 census. The movement manifested itself in sankritising tendencies with an assertion of Aryan origin and striving for higher social status by imitating higher caste customs and rituals.

With this lakhs of Rajbanshi took ritual bath in the Karatoya river and adopted the practices of the twice born (Dvija), like the wearing of the sacred thread (Upanayana), adoption of gotra name, shortening in period of 'asauch' from 30 days to 12. They gave up practices that were forbidden in the Hindu religion like the drinking of liquor (Teetotalism) and rearing of pigs. From 1872 to 1911 in an effort to be a part of the higher caste, the Koch went through three distinct social identities in the census, Koch to Rajbanshi (1872), Rajbanshi to Bhanga Kshatriya (1891), Bhanga Kshatriya to Rajbanshi Kshatriya (1911).

Today the Koch-Rajbongshis are found throughout North Bengal, particularly in the Dooars, as well as parts of Lower Assam, northern Bangladesh (Rangpur Division), the Terai of eastern Nepal and Bihar, and Bhutan.

Some writers suggest that the Rajbanshi people constitute from different ethnic groups who underwent Sankritisation to reach the present form and in the process abandoned their original Tibeto-burman tongue to be replaced by the Indo-Aryan languages. There exist Rajbanshi people in South Bengal districts of Midnapur, 24 Paraganas, Hoogly and Nadia  who might not belong to the same ethnic stock.

In 1937, various members of the Rajbanshi Kshatriya Samiti were elected to the Bengal Legislative Council from Rangpur, Dinajpur, Malda, and Jalpaiguri. These MLAs helped form the Independent Scheduled Caste Party. Upendra Nath Barman became a minister-in-charge of forests and excise in the Fazlul Haq government. However, the reservations provided to them also increased conflict within organizations representing Scheduled Castes, and many leaders of the Kshatriya Samiti left for the Congress party, while much of the masses were drawn to the Communists. In 1946, several Rajbanshi candidates were elected on reserved seats from North Bengal, with only one Rajbanshi candidate from the Kshatriya Samiti and Communist Party being elected. This division of Rajbanshi leadership meant they were in little position to have a say in the Partition of Bengal, although Jogendra Nath Mandal attempted to organize lower castes against Partition and then for a separate state of North Bengal.

Post-independence (1947-present) 
After Partition, the Kshatriya Samithi lost its headquarters at Rangpur and attempted to reestablish itself at Dinhata. However, a variety of new organisations to represent the Rajbanshi were being created. In Assam, the Rajbanshis were classified in a special category of OBC called MOBC. In North Bengal, the various new Rajbanshi organisations began to see the Rajbanshi identity as ethnolinguistic in nature rather than a caste, since the various other communities living in North Bengal and Lower Assam also spoke the Rajbanshi dialect. This linguistic awareness was heightened in 1953, when the government decided to reorganise the states on linguistic basis. Many of these organisations, such as Siliguri Zonal Rajbanshi Kshatriya Samiti agitated for the merger of Purnia division of Bihar and Goalpara district of Assam into West Bengal since these regions were largely populated by Rajbanshi speakers. This was continued into the 1960s with Rajbanshi activists frequently demanding for their speech to be recognized as separate from Bengali.

Occupation 
The Rajbongshis were traditionally agriculturalists, but due to their numerical dominance in North Bengal there were significant occupational differences among them. Most were agricultural labourers (halua) or sharecroppers (adhiar). These often worked for landed cultivators, called dar-chukanidars. Above them were the chukandiars and jotedars, and at the top were the zamindars. Some Rajbongshis were zamindars or jotedars.

Lifestyle and culture 

According to a 2019 research, the Koch Rajbongshi community has an oral tradition of agriculture, dance, music, medical practices, song, the building of house, culture, and language. Ideally the tribe transfer the know-how from one generation to another.

The Koch Rajbongshi community had traditionally been a largely agricultural community, cultivating mainly rice, pulses, and maize. Rice is the staple food for the majority of the population. Even in the 21st century, a large portion of this community still adheres to a rural lifestyle, though urbanization is on a constant rise. The food consumed and the diet pattern is similar to all the Koches of Assam, West Bengal, Nepal, Bangladesh, Meghalaya. Rice and Pulses are consumed on a regular basis along with vegetables and bhajis (fries- mainly potatoes). Typical is the Dhékir sāg and naphā sāg, two types of leafy vegetable preparation, mostly boiled with very little added oil, out of newly born shoots of fern leaves. In lower Assam, a vegetable preparation of bamboo shoots is also consumed. Consumption of stale rice or pantha bhāt is common within Koch Rajbongshi. Cooking is mainly done using mustard oil, though sunflower oil is sometimes used. As far as non-vegetarian foods are concerned, the Koch Rajbongshi population consumes a large amount of meat and eggs unlike other neighborhood populations from the Bengal region, who consume a large amount of fish. Goat meat and sheep (if available) is generally consumed, and consumption of fowl meat is discouraged as a result of Sanskritization, though these taboos have eroded over time. There were rituals involving sacrificing pigs in Ghordew puja, and ducks in Laxmi puja. Eggs of ducks and poultry are consumed. Ducks and Fish are also consumed but not in very large numbers. The rivers of northern Bengal does not sustain large varieties of fishes because of its non-perennial nature. However, in lower Assam areas, large rivers like the Brahmaputra sustain large varieties of fish which becomes an important part of the dietary habit of the Koch Rajbanshi living there.

Home design of a typical Koch Rajbanshi home is essential for the rectangular pattern, with an open space (egina/aingna) in the middle. This is done mostly for protection against both wild animals and strong winds. A Thakurghor of Manasha or Kali Thakur at the entrance is must in every Koch-Rajbongshi house. The north side holds the betel nut and fruit gardens, the west contains Bamboo gardens while the east and the south is generally left open to allow sunshine and air to penetrate into the household. Though such a pattern is more prominent among the landed gentry.

Traditional attires of Koch-Rajbongshis are mainly Patani, Agran, Angsha, Chadar, Lifan, Phota, and various other traditional costumes being weaved at their traditional handloom in their home. The traditional clothing for men is Angsha and Jama , while for women is Bukuni-Patani, Phota, Agran, Angsa, Lifan; Chadar a piece of cloth tied around the chest that extends up to the knee. Lifan or Phota are worn like a wrapper. The Koch Rajbongshi Tribe has still preserved their age-old ethnic attires and is being used on a regular basis as their common costumes, The Koch Rajbongshis prefer to wear their traditional attires in-spite of the fact that the modern costumes are widely available.

Music forms are integral part of Koch-Rajbongshi culture. The main musical forms of Koch-Rajbongshi culture are Bhawaiyya, Chatka, Chorchunni, Palatia, Lahankari, Tukkhya, Bishohora Pala among many others.  Various instruments are used for such performances, string instruments like Dotora, Sarindra and Bena, double-membrane instruments like Tasi, Dhak, Khol, Desi Dhol and Mridanga, gongs and bells like Kansi, Khartal and wind instruments like Sanai, Mukha bansi and Kupa bansi.

Notable people
Lalit Rajbanshi, Nepalese cricketer of Nepal National Cricket Team
Panchanan Barma, Indian social reformer of the Rajbanshi Community from West Bengal
Sarat Chandra Singha, Former Chief Minister of Assam
Swapna Barman, Indian heptathlete and gold medal winner at 2018 Asian Games from West Bengal
Tuluram Rajbanshi, Nepalese politician associated with Nepal Communist Party
Upendranath Barman, Indian politician from West Bengal
Madhab Rajbangshi, Indian Politician from Assam

See also
 Boro people
 Rabha people

Notes

References

 
 
 
 
 
 
 
 
 
 
 
 
 
 
 
 

 
Ethnic groups in Nepal
Tribes of Assam
Hindu ethnic groups
Scheduled Tribes of Assam
Ethnic groups in Northeast India
Ethnic groups in South Asia
Ethnic groups in Bangladesh
Social groups of Assam